Raja Sangram Singh was ruler of Kharagpur Raj in the 16th century. He was a contemporary of Akbar. Sangram Singh initially was allegiance to Akbar, but during the reign of Jahangir, he declared himself independence and was killed during battle with Mughal forces due to assassination. After his death, his son Toral Mal converting to Islam, changed his name to Roz Afzun, became loyal of Mughal and deployed as king of Kharagpur by Jahangir.

Reign

Ally of Akbar
He allied with Akbar and helped in suppression of Afagan rebellion in Bihar. He clashed with the Muran Mal of Pural Mal of Gidhaur. Then he participated Mughal expedition led by Shahbaz Khan Kamboh against the Afghans in Bengal and Odisha.

Attack by Puran Mal and Shahbaz Khan Kamboh
Then Puran Mal with Shahbaz Kamboh attacked  of Kharagpur. He had to fled forest for selter. He plotted to kill Shahbaz Khan Kamboh. A Rajput follower of Puran Mal allied with him, attempted to kill Shahbaz Khan Kamboh but killed another person in confusion. Then Shahbaz Khan Kamboh imprisonmed  Puran Mal in suspect. But later the assailant arrested and killed and Puran Mal released from Mughal imprisonment. Then Shahbaz Khan Kamboh transferred to Bengal from Bihar by Mughal. Due to this He again able gain seat of Kharagpur and became independent from Mughal.

Expendition against Afgan of Bengal and Odisha
Later Raja Man Singh was appointed as governor of Bihar, Bengal and Odisha. Man Singh forced him to become  tributary of Mughal.
In 1591, he participated in the Mughal expedition against Qutlugh Khan Lohani of Odisha with Man Singh and Puran Mal.

Rebellion against Jahangir and assassination
After death of Akbar, he attempted to become independent from Mughal rule. According to memoir of Jahangir, he collected around 4000 troops and large numbers of foot soldiers and challenge  Mughal authority. Baz Bahadur, the governor of Bihar attack Kharagpur and in the battle, Sangram Singh got killed and rebel were defeated. After his death his son Todar Mal converted to Islam, became king and remain loyal to Mughal.

According to William Wilson Hunter, in his work Stastical Account of Bengal, When Jahangir came to know about rebellious activity at Kharagpur, ordered Sangram Singh to present himself in court of Delhi but order ignored. So Jahangir ordered Jahangir Quli Khan, the subedar of Bihar to suppress the 
rebellion. Baz Bahadur a commander was send to Kharagpur. Raja Sangram Singh assembled his soldiers at Markan before a place near capital. The battle continued for several days. Then a foot soldier of Raja Sangram Singh went to the camp of Mughal forces and offered to assassinate the Raja Sangram Singh for a price. The offer was accepted by Mughal forces. The assassin succeeded in killing Sangram Singh. The army got confused after death of the king. They were fleeing from battle field but the wife of king, Rani Chandrajot,  encouraged the soldiers to fight. She made her son Toral Mal the new king and continued the battle for several months. Baz Bahadur became desperate 
to end the battle made a compromise. 
He promised the queen to intervene on her behalf if she and her 
son agreed go to the court of Jahangir. The Queen accepted the proposal and went to Delhi with him. But when they reached Delhi, treacherously Toral Mal was imprisoned. But on the request of Baz Bahadur, he was released and presented before the Jahangir. Jahangir impressed with Toral Mal's  manners and conversation adviced to change his religion, which he agreed. He was conferred with title of Roz Afzun and married to daughter of a noble. The territory of Kharagpur was assigned to Islam Khan for a year and then to Afzal KKha, the governor of 
Bihar.

According to 'Tarikh-i-Kharagpurraj, the Baz Bahadur was unable to defeat the force of Sangram Singh. So he plotted to kill Sangram Singh in treacherous ways and killed the king with the help of his relatives.

Robert Montgomery Martin, collected local account, according to which Todar Mal was appointed as morchulburdar a person who fan the king with features of Peacock. In a hunting expendition, he killed a tiger with a single-handedly. Impressed by this emperor appointed him as a noble and converted him and his tree sons to Islam. He was given name of Roz Afzun and married to daughter of Baz Bahadur. But the lady considering the marriage as degrading refused to stay with him. The mother of Roz Afzun complained it to Emperor. Then Emperor married Roz Afzun to daughter of Murad Bakhsh and made him cammander of 3000 men and his sons that of 1000. Then Emperor Jahangir appointed Roz Afzun as king of Kharagpur. Roz Afzun returned to Kharagpur with his wife leaving his son Abdul Shah at Mughal court as a hostage to ensure his fidelity towards Mughal.

References 

Year of birth missing
Year of death missing
16th-century Indian monarchs